Tan Twan Eng (b. 1972) is a Malaysian novelist who writes in English. He is best known for his 2012 book The Garden of Evening Mists which won the Man Asian Literary Prize and Walter Scott Prize for Historical Fiction, and was shortlisted for the Man Booker Prize, making Tan the first Malaysian to be recognised by all three awards.

Background and life
Tan was born in Penang and grew up in Kuala Lumpur. He is of the Straits Chinese descent. Tan speaks mainly English, Penang Hokkien, and some Cantonese.

Tan studied law at the University of London, and later worked as an advocate and solicitor in one of Kuala Lumpur's leading law firms before becoming a full-time writer.

He has a first-dan ranking in aikido and lives in Malaysia.

Career
His first novel, The Gift of Rain, published in 2007, was long-listed for the Man Booker Prize. It is set in Penang before and during the Japanese occupation of Malaya in World War II. The Gift of Rain has been translated into Italian, Spanish, Greek, Romanian, Czech, Serbian, French, Russian and Hungarian.

His second novel, The Garden of Evening Mists, was published in 2012. It was shortlisted for the 2012 Man Booker Prize and won the Man Asian Literary Prize, and the Walter Scott Prize for Historical Fiction. The novel was adapted into a film starring Hiroshi Abe, Lee Sinje, John Hannah, David Oakes and Sylvia Chang and was released in 2020.

Tan has spoken at literary festivals, including the Singapore Writers Festival, the Ubud Writers Festival in Bali, the Asia Man Booker Festival in Hong Kong, the Shanghai International Literary Festival, the Perth Writers Festival, the Abbotsford Convent in Melbourne, Australia, the Franschhoek Literary Festival in South Africa, the Borders Book Festival in Melrose, Scotland, the George Town Literary Festival in Penang, the Head Read Literary Festival in Tallinn, and many more.

He is one of the judges of the International Booker Prize 2023, the first Malaysian author to be appointed that role.

Works
 The Gift of Rain (2007)
 The Garden of Evening Mists (2011)
 The House of Doors (2023)

Awards 
 Man Asian Literary Prize (2012)
 £25,000 Walter Scott Prize for Historical Fiction (2013)

References

External links
 Author interview
 
 Bernard Wilson, “Trapped Between Worlds”: The Function of Memory, History and Body in the Fiction of Tan Twan Eng, Asiatic Vol 12/2, 2018 

Malaysian novelists
Malaysian writers
1972 births
Living people
Malaysian aikidoka
Malaysian male writers
Alumni of the University of London
Malaysian people of Hokkien descent
Malaysian people of Chinese descent
People from Penang
21st-century Malaysian people
21st-century novelists
21st-century male writers
University of Cape Town alumni
Walter Scott Prize winners